Poesia Musicada is a 2011 studio album by Brazilian artist Dori Caymmi. The album is a tribute to his father, Dorival Caymmi, as well as a celebratory landmark of 42 years with his songwriting partner, Brazilian poet Paulo César Pinheiro.

Track listing

All songs written by Dori Caymmi and Paulo César Pinheiro. Produced by Dori Caymmi.

References

External links
Dori Caymmi
[ Dori Caymmi] at Allmusic

2011 albums
Dori Caymmi albums